Talanoa Fuka Kitekei'aho (born Vaheloto, Tongatapu, 1958) is a former Tongan rugby union footballer who played as centre. He was also the Tonga Rugby Union interim CEO.

Career
He was first capped for Tonga in the match against Fiji, in Suva, on 8 September 1979. Kitekei'aho was also capped in the 1987 Rugby World Cup, playing all the three pool stage matches against Canada, Wales  and Ireland, the latter being his last cap for Tonga.

As Tonga Rugby Union CEO
In June 2013, Kitekei'aho was appointed as interim CEO for Tonga Rugby Union, which was occupied then by 'Emeline Tuita, whose term lasted less than six months. However, ‘Āminiasi Kefu stated that Kitekei'aho failed an interview to prove his possession of expertise and skills. In May 2016, Kitekeiaho protested about Fe'ao Vunipola's election as Tonga Rugby Union interim chairman and President, claiming it as 'unconstitutional'.

Notes

External links

1958 births
Living people
Tongan rugby union players
Tonga international rugby union players
People from Tongatapu
Rugby union centres